This is a list of Brazilian television related events from 1995.

Events

Debuts
24 April - Malhação (1995–present)

Television shows

1970s
Turma da Mônica (1976–present)

1990s
Castelo Rá-Tim-Bum (1994-1997)

Births
4 August - Bruna Marquezine, actress & model

Deaths

See also
1995 in Brazil